Laurence or Lawrence Craigie (c.1750–c.1833) was an 18th/19th century Scottish merchant and local politician who twice served as Lord Provost of Glasgow.

Life
He was the eldest son of John Craigie of Kilgraston, son of Lawerence Craigie (a Baron of the Exchequer) and his wife (and cousin) Anne Craigie.

He trained as a lawyer and became an advocate in 1773. However he appears to have become a merchant rather than practice law. He is listed as a merchant in Glasgow trading from the Counting House on Miller Street with lodgings on St Enoch Square in the late 18th century.

In 1787 he is listed as a member of the West India Club and as Secretary of Glasgow Golf Club.

He was first made Lord Provost in 1798, in succession to James McDowall. After two years in office he lost to rival, John Hamilton but returned to office two years later in 1802.

On 2 March 1803 he laid the foundation of the new theatre on Queen Street in Glasgow along with the architect David Hamilton.

By 1810 he was living permanently at 8 St Enoch Square. In 1832 his address jumps to 21 St Enoch Square (but this may be due to renumbering).

After his role of Lord Provost he was Tory Collector of Taxes (Cess Tax) for the City of Glasgow.

Family
He was married to Margaret Hall around 1790.

His eldest son appears at the visit of King George IV to Scotland in 1822, alongside John Thomas Alston as the then Lord Provost, as Laurence Craigie Jr.

His other children included General Patrick Edmonstone Craigie.

His brothers were John Craigie and Robert Craigie, Lord Craigie a Lord of Session and Senator of the College of Justice from 1811. His nephews included Rear Admiral Robert Craigie RN.

References

Scottish merchants
Lord Provosts of Glasgow